Escambia County is the name of two counties in the United States of America:
Escambia County, Alabama
Escambia County, Florida